En Directo Desde el Otro Lado (Straight from the Other Side) (2007) is the twenty-fifth album and seventh live album by Mexican rock and blues band El Tri.

Reception
The Allmusic review by Alex Henderson awarded the album 3.5 stars stating "One doesn't necessarily have to agree with everything Lora says in order to appreciate his overall artistry...But even if one disagrees with some of Loro's points (while agreeing with others), the album's melodies are always solid...All things considered, En Directo Desde el Otro Lado is a valuable and exciting document of El Tri's Gibson Amphitheater show of 2006.".

Track listing 
All tracks by Alex Lora

 "Tributo Al Goveneitor" (Tribute to The Governator) – 2:03
 "Metro Balderas" (Balderas Subway) – 7:16
 "Si México Ganara el Mundial" (If Mexico Won the World Cup) – 5:09
 "Presta" (Lend) – 4:56
 "Abuso de Autoridad" (Abuse of Authority) – 2:21
 "Políticos Culeros" (Asshole Politicians) – 2:31
 "El Muro" (The Wall) – 4:28
 "Masturbado" (Masturbates) – 3:24
 "Todo por el Rocanrol" (All For Rock`N Roll) – 5:55
 "Chavas Rockeras" (Rocking Gals) – 2:20
 "Todos Somos Piratas" (We're All Pirates) – 5:44
 "Sara" – 4:04
 "Che Guevara" – 6:45
 "FZ10" – 2:58
 "Mujer Diabólica" (Evil Woman) – 3:31

Personnel 

 Alex Lora – guitar, vocals, producer, mixing
 Rafael Salgado – harmonic
 Eduardo Chico – guitar
 Oscar Zarate – guitar
 Carlos Valerio - bass
 Chela Lora – backing vocals
 Ramon Perez – drums

Guest musicians 

Mike Daigeau – trombone
Dan Fornero – trumpet
Carlos Hauptvogel – drums
Arturo Labastida – saxophone
Sergio Mancera – guitar
Arturo Solar – trumpet

Technical personnel 

Alejandra Hoyos – photography
Alejandra Palacios – assistant

External links 
www.eltri.com.mx
[ En Directo Desde el Otro Lado] at Allmusic

References 

El Tri live albums
2007 live albums